Althaea armeniaca is a flowering plant in the family Malvaceae, found in southern Russia, northern Iran, and Armenia. In its native range its grows in dry continental climates.

Description
A. armeniaca is a tall, perennial herb with villous stems. The leaves are deeply divided into three ovate-lanceolate lobes, the central lobe being longer than the others. The leaf margin is serrated. The leaf surface has a villous indumentum of stellate hairs. The flowers are borne on multi-flowered peduncles.  The red petals are about 15 mm long. The mericarps have a rough surface and a pilose indumentum of stellate hairs.

References 

Malveae